Mohamed Soumaré (born 25 June 1996) is a Belgian professional footballer who plays as a striker for Belgian National Division 1 club RAAL La Louvière.

Club career
He scored his first goal after joining Melfi on loan in 2016 during his debut match against Catanzaro.

In March 2021, Soumaré joined RAAL La Louvière after being a free agent for almost a year.

Personal life
Soumaré resumed his studies in engineering management at the Université libre de Bruxelles. He is married and has a daughter.

References

External links
 
 

Living people
1996 births
Sportspeople from Conakry
Belgian people of Guinean descent
Association football forwards
Belgian footballers
U.S. Avellino 1912 players
A.S. Melfi players
S.S. Teramo Calcio players
F91 Dudelange players
RAAL La Louvière players
Serie B players
Serie C players
Luxembourg National Division players
Belgian National Division 1 players
Belgian expatriate footballers
Expatriate footballers in Italy
Expatriate footballers in Luxembourg
Belgian expatriate sportspeople in Italy
Belgian expatriate sportspeople in Luxembourg
Université libre de Bruxelles alumni